Route 20 is a highway in central Missouri.  Its eastern terminus is at U.S. Route 65 Business in Marshall; its western terminus is at Route 13 in Higginsville.

Route 20 was one of the original 1922 highways.  Its eastern terminus was originally at Huntsville at Route 10 (now U.S. Route 24).  Its western terminus was originally in Kansas City at Route 1. In 1926, the section west of Waverly became part of U.S. Route 24 and the section from Waverly to Marshall became part of U.S. Route 65. In 1933/1934, Route 20 was extended west on its current alignment to Higginsville. This section had been planned as Route 96 (Odessa to Marshall) in 1922, but was soon dropped from the state highway system. In 1934/1935, the section from Glasgow to Huntsville became part of Route 3 when that route was extended. The next year, the section from 
Marshall to Glasgow became part of Route 240.
Route 20 connects the towns of Higginsville, Corder, Alma, Blackburn and Marshall.

Major intersections

References

020
Transportation in Lafayette County, Missouri
Transportation in Saline County, Missouri